KMFR (1280 AM) is a radio station broadcasting a Spanish Variety format. Licensed to Pearsall, Texas, United States, the station serves the San Antonio area. The station is currently owned by David Martin Phillip and Marguerite Phillip, through licensee Rufus Resources, LLC.

History
The station was assigned the call letters KSAH on 2004-05-10. On 2004-05-20, the station changed its call sign to KTFM, on 2005-01-19 to KILM, on 2005-01-26 to KVWG, and on 2011-09-21, to the current KMFR.

References

External links
No Bull Radio Network Facebook

MFR